The David di Donatello for Best Foreign Actress is a category in the David di Donatello Awards, described as "Italy's answer to the Oscars". It was awarded by the Accademia del Cinema Italiano (ACI, Academy of Italian Cinema) to recognize outstanding efforts on the part of non-Italian film actresses during the year preceding the ceremony. The award was created during the second edition of the ceremony, in 1957, and cancelled after the 1996 event. The award was not granted in 1958.

Winners

1950s
1957
 Ingrid Bergman - Anastasia

1958
 Not awarded

1959
 Deborah Kerr - Separate Tables

1960s
1960
 Audrey Hepburn - The Nun's Story

1961
 Brigitte Bardot - The Truth

1962
 Audrey Hepburn - Breakfast at Tiffany's

1963
 Geraldine Page - Sweet Bird of Youth

1964
 Shirley MacLaine - Irma la Douce

1965
 Audrey Hepburn - My Fair Lady

1966
 Julie Andrews - The Sound of Music

1967
 Julie Christie - Doctor Zhivago (ex aequo)
 Elizabeth Taylor - The Taming of the Shrew

1968
 Faye Dunaway - Bonnie and Clyde (ex aequo)
 Katharine Hepburn - Guess Who's Coming to Dinner

1969
 Barbra Streisand - Funny Girl (ex aequo)
 Mia Farrow - Rosemary's Baby

1970s
1970
 Liza Minnelli - The Sterile Cuckoo

1971
 Ali MacGraw - Love Story

1972
 Elizabeth Taylor - Zee and Co.

1973
 Liza Minnelli - Cabaret

1974
 Barbra Streisand - The Way We Were (ex aequo)
 Tatum O'Neal - Paper Moon

1975
 Liv Ullmann - Scenes from a Marriage

1976
 Isabelle Adjani - The Story of Adele H. (ex aequo)
 Glenda Jackson - Hedda

1977
 Annie Girardot - Cours après moi que je t'attrape (ex aequo)
 Faye Dunaway - Network

1978
 Jane Fonda - Julia (ex aequo)
 Simone Signoret - The Life Before Us

1979
 Ingrid Bergman - Autumn Sonata (ex aequo)
 Liv Ullmann - Autumn Sonata

1980s
1980
 Isabelle Huppert - The Lacemaker

1981
 Catherine Deneuve - The Last Metro

1982
 Diane Keaton - Reds

1983
 Julie Andrews - Victor/Victoria

1984
 Shirley MacLaine - Terms of Endearment

1985
 Meryl Streep - Falling in Love

1986
 Meryl Streep - Out of Africa

1987
 Norma Aleandro - The Official Story

1988
 Cher - Moonstruck

1989
 Jodie Foster - The Accused

1990s
1990
 Jessica Tandy - Driving Miss Daisy

1991
 Anne Parillaud - La Femme Nikita

1992
 Jodie Foster - The Silence of the Lambs

1993
 Emmanuelle Béart - A Heart in Winter (ex aequo)
 Tilda Swinton - Orlando (ex aequo)
 Emma Thompson - Howards End

1994
 Emma Thompson - The Remains of the Day

1995
 Jodie Foster - Nell

1996
 Susan Sarandon - Dead Man Walking

References

External links
 
 David di Donatello official website
 

David di Donatello
Film awards for lead actress